William Desmond Young (6 June 1931 – 4 March 2020) was an Australian rules footballer who played with the St Kilda Football Club in the Victorian Football League (VFL).

Young was an all-round sportsman, a top goal scorer in country football and a cricketer who once top-scored for a Victorian country team against England. He was also a well-performed track cyclist, represented Country Victoria at tennis and later in life was an A-grade squash player. He is widely regarded as the best all-round sportsman to come out of Gippsland.

In 1948, 1950, 1952, 1954 and 1955, Young was leading goalkicker in the Gippsland Football League, kicking 160 goals in 1954 and 136 in 1955. His best efforts were 26 goals in a game in 1950 and 22 in 1954.

Young debuted aged 25 with the St Kilda Football Club at full forward, kicking 56 goals in his debut year and winning the VFL's leading goalkicker award.

He was St Kilda's leading goal-kicker from 1956 to 1960.

Blair Campbell credited him with inventing the reverse punt shot at goal.

Young was rather frail for a VFL full-forward and under 6 feet, but he used his leap to mark overhead.

In 1962 he captain-coached Black Rock in the Federal FL and won the league goalkicking with 76 goals. He accepted a role at St Kilda as an assistant coach to Allan Jeans in 1963 that ended his playing career.

References

External links

St Kilda Hall of Fame Profile
Saints honour roll

1931 births
2020 deaths
St Kilda Football Club players
Coleman Medal winners
Australian rules footballers from Victoria (Australia)